This is a list of members of the Western Australian Legislative Council from 22 May 1934 to 21 May 1936. The chamber had 30 seats made up of ten provinces each electing three members, on a system of rotation whereby one-third of the members would retire at each biennial election.

Notes
 At the 12 May 1934 elections, James George, a fellow Nationalist candidate, won the Metropolitan Province seat from incumbent member James Franklin on Labor preferences (both candidates got 1,991 primary votes). Upon a petition to the Court of Disputed Returns, Franklin was declared elected on 21 November 1934 without a by-election.

Sources
 
 
 

Members of Western Australian parliaments by term